This is a list of beaches in New England sorted by state then town. Beaches are not exclusively all on seashores but may also be located on lakes, rivers or other bodies of water.

Connecticut 

Bridgeport
Pleasure Beach
Seaside Park
Brookfield
Brookfield Town Beach (not on shoreline)
Lillinonah Woods Beach (not on shoreline)
Clinton
Clinton Town Beach
Colchester
Day Pond State Park (not on shoreline)
Coventry
Lisicke Beach
Patriots Park
East Lyme
Rocky Neck State Park
McCook's Beach
Hole in the Wall Beach
Ellington
Sandy Beach on Crystal Lake
Fairfield
Jennings Beach
Lake Mohegan
Penfield Beach and Rickards Beach
Fairfield Beach
South Pine Creek Beach
Sasco Beach
Southport Beach
Griswold
Hopeville Pond State Park (not on shoreline)
Guilford
Lake Quonnipaug
Jacob's Beach
Groton
Bluff Point Beach
Eastern Point Beach
Madison
Hammonasset Beach State Park
Milford
Gulf Beach
Silver Sands State Park
New Fairfield
New Fairfield Town Park (not on shoreline)
Squantz Pond State Park (not on shoreline)
New Haven
Lighthouse Point Park
New London
Ocean Beach Park
Niantic
Crescent Beach
Norwalk
Calf Pasture Beach and Shady Beach
Old Lyme
Sound View Beach
Old Saybrook
Harvey's Beach
Stratford
Long Beach
Short Beach
West Haven
West Haven Beaches (Bradley Point, Morse Beach, Oak Street Beach, Sandy Point)
Westport
Sherwood Island State Park
Compo Beach
Burying Hill Beach
Old Mill Beach

Maine 
Maine's  Atlantic Ocean coast and nearby islands offer many sandy beaches. From east (north) to west (south):

 Down East
 Eastport - Shackford Head State Park - Cony Beach
 Machiasport - Jasper Beach
 Roque Bluffs - Roque Bluffs State Park
 Mount Desert Island
 Bar Harbor - Sand Beach in Acadia National Park
 Mount Desert - Little Hunters Beach in Acadia National Park
 Lamoine - Lamoine Beach Park / Lamoine State Park
 Penobscot Bay
 Isle au Haut - Barred Harbor
 Deer Island - Barred Island Preserve (low tide only)
 Castine - Wadsworth Cove Beach
 Stockton Springs - Sandy Point Beach
 Islesboro
 Beach at Turtle Head Preserve
 Sprague's Beach
 Warren Island State Park
 Big Tree Beach
 Billys Shore
 Islesboro Town Beach
 Searsport - Moose Point State Park
 Belfast
 Public Shore along Searsport Ave
 Heritage Park
 Northport
 Cals Beach (private)
 Pebble Beach (rocky, private)
 Lincolnville
 Wales Beach (private)
 Lincolnville Beach
 Camden - Laite Memorial Beach
 Rockland
 Beach along Rockland Harbor Trail
 South End Beach
 Owls Head
 Beach at Ocean Avenue
 Owls Head State Park
 Crescent Beach
 Crocketts Beach
 Ash Point Beach
 Lucia Beach (private)
 Birch Point State Park
 Mid Coast
 Bristol
 Colonial Pemaquid Beach
 Pemaquid Beach Park
 South Bristol - Sand Cove Beach
 Georgetown - Reid State Park
 East Beach
 Mile Beach
 Half Mile Beach
 Phippsburg
 Popham Beach
 Seawall Beach
 Head Beach
 Southern Maine Coast
 Harpswell - Cedar Beach, Bailey Island
 Freeport - Winslow Memorial Park
 Yarmouth
 Sandy Point Bridge, Cousins Island
 Littlejohn Beach, Cousins Island
 Cumberland - Broad Cove Reserve
 Long Island
 East End Beach
 Andrews Beach
 South Beach
 Fowler Beach
 Portland
 East End Beach
 Big Beach, Cushing Island
 Little Beach, Cushing Island
 West Shore Sandy Beach, Little Diamond Island
 South Portland - Willard Beach
 Cape Elizabeth
 Cliff House Beach
 Crescent Beach State Park
 Scarborough
 Higgins Beach
 Scarborough Beach State Park
 Western Beach (private)
 Back Shore
 Pine Point Beach (contiguous with Old Orchard Beach)
 Grand Beach (contiguous with Old Orchard Beach)
Old Orchard Beach
 Saco, Maine - Ferry Beach State Park (contiguous with Old Orchard Beach)
 Biddeford
 Hills Beach
 Fortunes Rocks Beach
 Horseshoe Cove
 New Barn Cove
 Kennebunkport
 Arundel Beach (rocky)
 Colony Beach
 Goose Rocks Beach
 Cleaves Cove Beach
 Kennebunk
 Gooch's Beach
 Middle Beach
 Mother's Beach
 Kennebunk Beach
 Parson's Beach
 Laudholm Beach
 Wells
 Drakes Island Beach
 Wells Beach
 Moody Beach (private)
 Ogunquit
 Footbridge Beach
 Ogunquit Beach
 York
 Short Sands Beach (village of York Beach)
 Long Sands Beach (village of York Beach)
 York Harbor Beach
 Kittery
 Seapoint Beach
 Crescent Beach
 Fort Foster Beach

Lakes, ponds, and rivers:
 Richmond - Peacock Beach State Park
 Greenville, Maine - Moosehead Lake - Lily Bay State Park
 Poland - Range Ponds State Park
 Sebago Lake State Park
 Ellsworth - Branch Lake Beach
 Canaan - Lake George Beach
 Newcastle - Shoreline Beach, Damariscotta River
 Rockland - Johnson Memorial Park, Chickawaukie Pond
 Camden - Barrett's Cove Public Beach, Megunticook Lake

Massachusetts 
Salt-water beaches in Massachusetts are entirely in the eastern part of the state, concentrated in particular in Cape Cod and islands along its  of coastline: Inland beaches are on ponds, beaches, and rivers.

Cape Cod

Barnstable
Bone Hill
Bridge Street
Cordwood
Covells Beach
Craigville Beach
Crockers Neck
Cross Street
Dowses Beach
East Beach
Estey Avenue Beach
Fifth Ave
Fifth Ave (boat launch)
Indian Trail
Kalmus Ocean
Kalmus Yacht
Kennedy Memorial
Keyes Beach
Little River
Loops Beach
Millway
Oregon Beach
Oyster Place Road
Prince Cove
Ropes Beach
Sandy Neck
Scudder Lane
Veterans Beach
Wianno Avenue
Bourne
Barlows Landing
Cataumet Harbor
Electric Avenue
Gray Gables
Monument Beach
Patiusset Beach
Sagamore Beach
Scenic Park
Brewster
Breakwater
Cliff Pond Beach, Nickerson State Park
Crosby
Ellis
Flax Pond Beach, Nickerson State Park
Linnell Landing Beach
Little Cliff Pond, Nickerson State Park
Paines Creek
Point of Rocks
Robbins Hill
Saints
Chatham
Andrew Hardings Lane Beach
Bucks Creek
Cockle Cove Beach
Cockle Cove Creek at Parking Lot
Cockle Cove Creek at Ridgevale Bridge
Forest Street Beach
Hardings Beach East
Hardings Beach West
Jacknife Harbor Beach
Lighthouse Beach
Oyster Pond Beach
Pleasant Street Beach
Ridgevale Beach
Scatteree Town Landing
Dennis
Bayview
Chapin Memorial Beach
Cold Storage
Corporation
Crowes Pasture Beach
Follins Pond
Glendon Road
Haigis
Harborview
Howes Street
Inman
Mayflower Beach
Raycroft
Sea Street
Sea Street (Dennisport)
Sea Street (East Dennis)
South Village
Sullivan
Trotting Park
West Dennis
West Dennis (Residential)
West Dennis (W. of Snack Bar)
West Dennis (West)
Eastham
Boat Meadow
Campground
Coast Guard Beach, Cape Cod National Seashore
Coast Guard Beach 1
Coast Guard Beach 2
Cole Road
Cooks Brook
Dyer Prince
First Encounter
First Encounter (Beach)
First Encounter (Spit River)
Kingsbury
Nauset Light Beach, Cape Cod National Seashore
Nauset Light Beach 1
Nauset Light Beach 2
Nauset Light Beach 3
South Sunken Meadow
Thumpertown
Town Cove
Falmouth
Bristol Beach
Chappaquoit Beach
Falmouth Heights Beach
Megansett Beach
Menauhant Beach
Old Silver Beach
Surf Drive Beach
Woodneck Beach
Harwich
Atlantic Avenue Beach
Bank Street Beach
Belmont Road Beach
Brooks Road Beach
Bucks Pond
Cahoon's Road Beach
Earle Road Beach
Gray Neck Road Beach
Hinkley's Pond
Jackknife Beach, Pleasant Bay
Long Pond
Merkel Beach
Neel Road Beach
Pleasant Road Beach
Red River Beach
Sand Pond
Sea Street Beach
Seymour Pond
Wah-Wah-Taysee Road Beach
Windemere Bluffs Beach
Zylpha Road Beach
Mashpee
South Cape Beach, South Cape Beach State Park
Orleans
Nauset Beach
Skaket Beach
Provincetown
Herring Cove, Cape Cod National Seashore
Race Point, Cape Cod National Seashore
Sandwich
Scusset Beach, Scusset Beach State Reservation
Truro
Beach Point (Truro, Massachusetts)
Coast Guard Beach a.k.a. "Highland Beach"
Fisher Beach
Head of the Meadow, Cape Cod National Seashore
High Head Beach
Longnook Beach
Noon's Landing
Wellfleet
Cahoon Hollow Beach, Cape Cod National Seashore
Marconi Beach, Cape Cod National Seashore

Martha's Vineyard

Chilmark
Chilmark Pond Preserve
Great Rock Bight
Lucy Vincent Beach
Lucy Vincent Beach - Chilmark Pond
Lucy Vincent Beach - Ocean
Menemsha Beach
Menemsha Pond
Squibnocket Beach
Edgartown
Bend-in-the-Road Beach
Chappy Point Beach
East Beach
East Beach (Chappy)
Edgartown Great Pond
Felix Neck
Fuller Street
Joseph Sylvia Big Bridge
Joseph Sylvia Sound
Norton Point Beach
Norton Point Beach - east Katama Bay
Norton Point Beach - east ocean
Norton Point Beach - west bay (boat launch)
Norton Point Beach - west ocean
South Beach State Park
South Beach State Park - Middle
South Beach State Park - Right Fork West
Wasque Swim Beach
Fairhaven
Fort Phoenix, Fort Phoenix State Reservation
Knollmere
Manhattan Avenue
Raymond Street
West Island
West Island - Causeway
West Island - Towns Beach
Weeden Rd

Nantucket
Nantucket
Brant Point
Children's Beach
Cisco Beach
Dionis Beach
Francis Street
Jetties Beach
Madaket Beach
Siasconset Beach
Surfside Beach

North Shore

Beverly
Brackenbury
Dane Street
Dane Street Bathhouse
Dane Street Jetty
Dane Street Outfall
Goat Hill
Independence
Lynch Park
Mingo
Ober Park
Rice Beach
Rice Outfall
Sandy Point
West Beach
Woodbury
Essex
Clammers Beach
Front Beach
Gloucester
Coffins Beach
Cressy's Beach
Good Harbor Beach
Half Moon Beach
Magnolia Beach
Niles Beach
Pavilion Beach
Plum Cove Beach
Wingaersheek Beach
Lynn
Kings Beach, Lynn Shores Reservation
Manchester-by-the-Sea
Singing Beach
Nahant
Nahant Beach, Lynn Shores Reservation
Newbury/Newburyport
Plum Island
Revere
Revere Beach, Revere Beach Reservation
Rockport
Cape Hedge Beach
Front Beach/Back Beach
Long Beach
Rowley
Plum Island
Salisbury
Salisbury Beach, Salisbury Beach State Reservation
Swampscott
Eismans Beach
Fishermans Beach
Kings Beach
Phillips Beach

Boston Harbor

Boston
 Dorchester Bay
 Old Harbor Reservation
 Carson Beach
 L Street Beach
 M Street Beach
 City Point Beach at Farragut Road
 Pleasure Bay beaches (on Day Boulevard side and Castle Island
 Dorchester Shores Reservation (discontinuous)
Malibu Beach
Savin Hill Beach
Tenean Beach (Neponset River)
Constitution Beach, Belle Isle Marsh Reservation
Boston Harbor Islands National Recreation Area
Bumpkin Island
Lovell's Island Beach
Spectacle Island
Winthrop
Short Beach, Belle Isle Reservation
Winthrop Beach, Belle Isle Marsh Reservation
Yirrell Beach, Belle Isle Marsh Reservation

South Shore

Braintree
Smith Beach
Sunset Lake
Cohasset
Black Rock Beach
Little Harbor
Sailing Club
Sandy Beach
Sandy Cove
Yacht Club
Duxbury
Duxbury Beach
Hardin Hill
Howlands Landing
Landing Road
Residents Beach
Shipyard Lane
West End
Hull
Nantasket Beach, Nantasket Reservation
Ipswich
Clark Beach
Crane Beach
Pavilion Beach
Plum Island
Steep Hill Beach
Plymouth
Charge Pond Beach, Myles Standish State Forest
College Pond Beach, Myles Standish State Forest
Curlew Pond Beach, Myles Standish State Forest
Fearings Pond Beach, Myles Standish State Forest
Plymouth Long Beach
White Horse Beach
Quincy
Wollaston Beach, Quincy Shore Reservation
Scituate
Humarock Beach

South Coast

Dartmouth
Anthonys
Apponagansett Town Beach
Barneys Joy
Bayview
Demarest Lloyd Beach, Demarest Lloyd State Park
Hidden Bay
Jones Town Beach
Moses Creek
Nonquitt
Oak Hill Shores
Round Hill
Salters Point East
Salters Point South
Freetown
Assonet:
Assonet Bay Shores Association Beach (private)
Porter Pastures Beach
East Freetown:
Town Beach
Westport
Horseneck Beach, Horseneck Beach State Reservation

Inland
Carver
Barretts Pond, Myles Standish State Forest
Concord
Walden Pond, Walden Pond State Reservation
Danvers
Sandy Beach East
Sandy Beach West
Milton
Houghton's Pond, Blue Hills Reservation
Natick
Cochituate Lake Beach, Cochituate State Park
North Andover
Berry Pond Beach, Harold Parker State Forest
Frye Pond Beach, Harold Parker State Forest
Taunton
Middle Pond Beach, Massasoit State Park
Watson Pond Beach, Watson Pond State Park
Saugus
Pearce Lake, Breakheart Reservation
Peckham Pond, Breakheart Reservation
Winchester
Sandy Beach, Mystic River Reservation

New Hampshire 
Despite having a tidal coastline of just  and an ocean shoreline of just , New Hampshire has at least 10 oceanfront beaches:

Hampton
Hampton Beach, Hampton Beach State Park
North Beach
New Castle
Great Island Common
North Hampton
North Hampton Beach State Park
Rye
Bass Beach
Cable Beach
Jenness Beach State Park
Rye Beach
Rye North Beach
Wallis Sands State Beach
Seabrook
Seabrook Beach

Rhode Island 

Rhode Island has saltwater beaches along Narragansett Bay and the Atlantic Ocean from which it gets its state nickname, "The Ocean State". In addition, the state has several freshwater beaches along its rivers.  

Kickamuit River beaches:
 Bristol - Juniper Trail Beach

Sakonnet River beaches:
Tiverton (east side)
Grinnell's Beach
Fogland Beach
 Portsmouth (northwest side)
 Teddy's Beach
 Grimmell Beach
 Island Park Beach
 McCorrie Point Beach
 Sandy Point Beach
 Pebble Beach
Middletown (southwest side)
Third Beach

Providence River beaches:
 Edgewood Beach, Cranston
 Sabin Point Waterfront Park (no swimming)
 Alling Beach, Barrington
 (more beaches on both sides with no names on Google Maps as of 30 Jun 2021)

Narragansett Bay beaches include:
Barrington
Barrington Beach
Warren:
 Warren Town Beach
Bristol:
 Bristol Town Beach
 Walley Street Beach
Prudence Island:
 Prudence Beach
Warwick
 Conimicut Point Beach
 Bayside Beach
 Longmeadow Beach
 Rocky Point Beach
 Oakland Beach
 Buttonwood Beach in Warwick City Park
 Goddard Memorial State Beach, Goddard Memorial State Park
East Greenwich
 End of the World Beach
 Sandy Point Beach
 North Kingstown
 Beach at Bluff Point
 Calf Pasture Point Beach
 Spink Neck Beach
 Compass Rose Beach
 Blue Beach
 North Kingstown Town Beach
 Ed's Beach
 Beach at Rome Point
 Plum Point Beach (Plum Beach)
 Narragansett
 Beach at South Ferry Road
 Kelly Beach
 Bonnet Shores Beach
 Aquidneck Island (west side)
 Portsmouth
 Newport Beach Club (private)
 Newport (east to west)
 King Park Beach on Wellington Avenue
 Fort Adams State Park
 Fort Adams State Beach on Fort Adams Drive
 A small beach on Lincoln Drive
 Stalnaker Beach
 Jamestown (Conanicut Island, north to south)
 Sunset Beach
 Shores Beach
 Longs Beach
 East Ferry Beach
 Mackerel Cove Beach
 Old Salt Work Beach

Main Atlantic coast beaches include, from east to west:
 Little Compton
 South Shore Beach a.k.a. Town of Little Compton Beach
 Goosewing Beach (owned by The Nature Conservancy, includes Benjamin Family Environmental Center, adjacent to Quicksand Pond, accessed from South Shore Beach)
 Beach at Little Pond Cove
 Beach at Briggs Marsh
 Warren's Point Beach Club (private)
 Beach at Round Pond
 Lloyd's Beach
 Tappens Beach
 Middletown
 Sachuest Beach (Second Beach)
Newport
 Atlantic Beach (contiguous with Easton's Beach across a small creek)
 Easton's Beach (First Beach)
 Belmont Beach (small, rocky)
 Rejects' Beach or People's Beach (contiguous with Bailey's Beach, at the end of the Newport Cliff Walk)
 Bailey's Beach (private)
 Gooseberry Beach (privately owned but open to public)
 Hazard's Beach (privately owned)
 King's Beach on Ocean Avenue
 Collins Beach
 Jamestown
 Mackerel Cove
Narragansett
 Dunes Club Beach
 Conochet Club Beach
Narragansett Town Beach
 Punk Rock Beach / Point Judith (rocky)
 Camp Cronin Fishing Area / Point Judith in south parcel of Fishermen's Memorial State Park (rocky)
 Roger Wheeler State Beach a.k.a. Sand Cove Beach (contiguous to the west)
 Galilee Beach Club Beach (contiguous)
Salty Brine State Beach (contiguous to the east)
Scarborough State Beach Complex - North & South
South Kingstown
 East Matunuck State Beach
 Deep Hole Fishing Area
 Matunuck Beach
 South Kingstown Town Beach (contiguous with Willow Dell Beach)
 Willow Dell Beach (contiguous with neighboring beaches)
 Roy Carpenter's Beach (contiguous with neighboring beaches)
 Moonstone Beach (contiguous with neighboring beaches, formerly a nude beach)
Charlestown (neighborhood of Quonochontaug)
Blue Shutters Town Beach
Burlingame State Park
Charlestown Breachway State Beach, Charlestown Breachway
Charlestown Town Beach
East Beach State Beach, Ninigret Conservation Area
 Central Beach 
 West Beach
Westerly
 Weekapaug Beech
 Weekapaug Inn Beach
 Fenway Beach (in the neighborhood of Weekapaug)
 Dune's Park Beach (private but open to public for fee)
 Seaside Beach Club Beach (members only)
 Westerly Town Beach (residents only, contiguous with neighboring beaches)
 Atlantic Beach (contiguous)
 Westerly New Town Beach a.k.a. Wuskenau Beach
 Jim's Beach Misquamicut (contiguous)
Misquamicut State Beach
Misquamicut Fire District Beaches (residents only, contiguous) 
 Lawton Beach
 Benson Beach
 Clark Farms Beach
 East Beach (contiguous with neighboring beaches)
 Ocean House Beach
 Watch Hill Beach
Napatree Point

Block Island beaches include:
Crescent Beach
Surfers Beach
Mansion Beach

Lake and pond beaches include:
 Providence County (north):
 Gillerans Pond Beach, Burrillville
 Wescott Beach, Glocester
 Keech Pond Beach, Glocester
 Steers Beach, Glocester
 Mountaindale Beach, Smithfield
 Slacks Pond Beach, Smithfield
 Hope Pond Recreation Area beach, Scituate
 Georgiaville Beach, Smithfield
 Kent County (central):
 Briar Point Beach, Coventry
 Gorton Pond, Warwick
 Little Pond, Warwick
 Sand Pond, Warwick
 Washington County (south):
 Browning Mill Pond Area Beach, Richmond
 Burlingame State Park Beach, Watchaug Pond, Charlestown

Vermont

Lake Champlain

Lake Champlain beaches by municipality:
 Addison
 D.A.R. State Park
 Alburgh
 Alburg Dunes State Park
Burlington
North Beach
Colchester
Mallets Bay
 Grand Isle
 Grand Isle State Park
 Milton
 Sand Bar State Park
 North Hero
 Knight Point State Park
 North Hero State Park
Shelburne
Shelburne Bay
St. Albans
Burton Island State Park
Kill Kare State Park

Other northern Vermont

Brighton State Park - Island Pond, Brighton
Crystal Lake State Park - Crystal Lake, Barton
Elmore State Park - Lake Elmore, Elmore
 Groton State Forest
 Boulder Beach State Park - Lake Groton, Groton
 Ricker Pond State Park
 Stillwater Recreation Area
Lake Carmi State Park - Lake Carmi, Enosburg Falls
Maidstone State Park - Maidstone Lake, Maidstone

Central Vermont
Bomoseen State Park - Lake Bomoseen
Branbury State Park - Lake Dunmore
Camp Plymouth State Park - Echo Lake, Ludlow
Half Moon Pond State Park
Lake St. Catherine State Park
Silver Lake State Park
Waterbury Center State Park - Waterbury Reservoir in Mount Mansfield State Forest

Southern Vermont
Lake Shaftsbury State Park

See also
List of beaches in the United States
List of beaches

References

External links 
 Beachapedia's State of the Beach reports for: Connecticut, Maine, Massachusetts, New Hampshire, Rhode Island
 RI Coastal Resources Management Council - Public rights of way for beach access

New England
New England